Petoskey may refer to a number of articles relating to the U.S. state of Michigan:

 Petoskey, Michigan, a city in Emmet County, in the Northern Lower Peninsula.
 Petosegay, an Odawa chief.
 Petoskey Downtown Historic District
 Petoskey Grocery Company Building
 Petoskey High School
 Petoskey Motor Speedway
 Petoskey News-Review
 Petoskey Public Works Utility Building
 Petoskey State Park
 Petoskey station
 Petoskey stone, a fossilized coral that is the state stone of Michigan.